Ken Robinson (born July 15, 1963) is an American retired sprinter.

References

1963 births
Living people
American male sprinters
Place of birth missing (living people)
Athletes (track and field) at the 1983 Pan American Games
Pan American Games gold medalists for the United States
Pan American Games medalists in athletics (track and field)
Universiade medalists in athletics (track and field)
Universiade gold medalists for the United States
Medalists at the 1983 Summer Universiade
Medalists at the 1983 Pan American Games